The Aphrodite Hills Cyprus Showdown was a professional golf tournament that was held 5–8 November 2020 at the Aphrodite Hills Resort, in Paphos, Cyprus. The tournament was contested over 72-holes of stroke play but featured a novel elimination format. 

The tournament, promoted by International Sports Management, was initially announced as the Cyprus Classic and was intended to be a one-off event on the European Tour calendar during the 2020 season. It was the second of two tournaments in Cyprus, held the week after the Aphrodite Hills Cyprus Open at the same venue.

Robert MacIntyre shot a final round 64 to claim the title; one stroke better than Masahiro Kawamura.

Format
The Cyprus Showdown was contested over 72-holes of stroke play but featured a novel elimination format. The players with the lowest 32 scores after 36-holes progressed, however their scores were not carried forward. After a further 18 holes, the top 16 players qualified through to the final round, for which the scores were reset again.

Winners

References

External links
Coverage on European Tour official site

Former European Tour events
Golf tournaments in Cyprus